Life of Maharaja Sir Jung Bahadur of Nepal is a 1909 biography of Jung Bahadur Rana, founder of the Rana dynasty, written by Padma Jung Rana. The book gives an account of detailed information about Jung Bahadur. It is generally regarded as being filial biased and lacking research.

References

Citations

Bibliography

External links
 Life of Maharaja Sir Jung Bahadur of Nepal at Internet Archive

1909 non-fiction books
Books about Nepal
Nepalese non-fiction books
Nepalese biographies
Nepalese literature in English
Cultural depictions of Jung Bahadur Rana